Economics of Transition is a quarterly peer-reviewed academic journal published by Wiley-Blackwell on behalf of the European Bank for Reconstruction and Development. The journal was established in 1993. The journal publishes articles on the economics of structural transformation, institutional development and growth. Economics of Transition publishes full-length articles as well as symposia (collections of articles on a more narrowly defined topic) and book reviews.

According to the Journal Citation Reports, the journal has a 2011 impact factor of 0.679, ranking it 177th out of 321 journals in the category "Economics".

References

External links 
 

Wiley-Blackwell academic journals
English-language journals
Publications established in 1993
Quarterly journals
Economics journals